Ernst Christian Friedrich Schering (31 May 1824 – 27 December 1889) was a German apothecary and industrialist who created the Schering Corporation. The company split into Schering AG and Schering-Plough after US assets were seized during World War II.

Biography
Schering was born on 31 May 1824 in Prenzlau. In 1851 he opened a pharmacy in Chausseestrasse, in the north of Berlin. He died on December 27, 1889, and was buried in the Protestant Friedhof III der Jerusalems- und Neuen Kirchengemeinde (Cemetery No. III of the congregations of Jerusalem's Church and New Church) in Berlin-Kreuzberg, south of Hallesches Tor.

Legacy
The Ernst Schering Prize is awarded annually in his honour by the Schering Foundation for outstanding research in medicine, biology or chemistry.

References

Schering people
Schering-Plough
Businesspeople in the pharmaceutical industry
German company founders
19th-century German businesspeople
1824 births
1889 deaths